Ed Cunningham (born August 17, 1969) is an American sports announcer, film producer, and former professional American football player.

Following his career in the National Football League, Cunningham worked as an commentator for different media outlets, most recently ESPN. In 2017, he resigned citing his personal concerns with safety risks posed by the sport of football.

Playing career

He played center for five seasons for the Phoenix/Arizona Cardinals and the Seattle Seahawks of the National Football League. Prior to his professional football career, Cunningham played center for the Washington Huskies, helping them win a national championship in 1991.

Sports commentator

After his football career, he became a football analyst for TNN (now known as Spike) calling games for the Arena Football League with Eli Gold as his broadcast partner. Cunningham also called Arizona Rattlers games for KUTP TV and KGME AM.

In 1997, Cunningham became a regional college football analyst for CBS Sports. Cunningham moved over to ABC Sports in August 2000.

In 2006, with the merger of ESPN and ABC Sports, Cunningham began appearing as analyst on ESPN College Football as well.

In the years that followed, Cunningham's commentary increasingly drew the ire of college football coaches, resulting in at least two occasions where coaches responded directly to Cunningham's broadcasting commentary.  These included Nebraska's Bo Pelini, Iowa's Kirk Ferentz, who called comments by Cunningham "surprising and offensive," and Michigan's Jim Harbaugh, who condemned Cunningham's comments regarding a Michigan player's injury.  Cunningham later apologized for the Michigan comments.

Cunningham resigned from ESPN prior to the 2017 college season, citing disenchantment with football due to growing evidence of the risk of chronic traumatic encephalopathy that the sport poses for its players.

Film career

Additionally, he was a producer on the documentaries The King of Kong: A Fistful of Quarters and Undefeated (2011), which won the Academy Award for Best Documentary Feature.

References

External links
 
 

1969 births
Living people
American film producers
American football centers
American football offensive guards
American television sports announcers
Arena football announcers
College football announcers
Arizona Cardinals players
Seattle Seahawks players
Washington Huskies football players
Players of American football from Washington, D.C.